Danieri Basammula-Ekkere Mwanga II Mukasa (1868 – 8 May 1903) was Kabaka of Buganda from 1884 until 1888 and from 1889 until 1897. He was the 31st Kabaka of Buganda.

Claim to the throne 
He was born at Nakawa in 1868. His father was Muteesa I of Buganda, who reigned between 1856 and 1884. His mother was Abakyala Abisagi Bagalayaze, the 10th of his father's 85 wives. He ascended to the throne on 18 October 1884, after the death of his father. He established his capital on Mengo Hill.

Reign
Mwanga came to the throne at the age of 16. He increasingly regarded the greatest threat to his rule as coming from the Christian missionaries who had gradually penetrated Buganda.  His father had played-off the three religious traditions - Catholics, Protestants, and Muslims - against each other and thus had balanced the influence of the powers that were backing each group in order to extend their reach into Africa.  Mwanga II took a much more aggressive approach, expelling missionaries and insisting that Christian converts abandon their faith or face death. A year after becoming king he executed Yusufu Rugarama, Makko Kakumba, and Nuuwa Sserwanga, who had converted to Christianity on 31 January 1885. On 29 October 1885, he had the incoming 37 year old Anglican archbishop James Hannington assassinated on the eastern border (Busoga) of his kingdom.

For Mwanga, the ultimate humiliation was the male Catholic pages of his harem resisting his advances. According to tradition, the king was the centre of power and authority, and he could dispense with any life as he wished. It was unheard of for mere pages to reject the wishes of a king. Given those conflicting values, Mwanga was determined to rid his kingdom of the new teaching and its followers. Mwanga therefore precipitated a showdown in May 1886 by ordering converts in his court to choose between their new faith and complete obedience to his orders and kingdom.

It is believed that at least 30 Catholic and Protestant neophytes went to their deaths. Twenty-two of the men, who had converted to Catholicism, were burned alive at Namugongo in June 1886 and later became known as the Uganda Martyrs. Among those executed were two Christians who held the court position of Master of the Pages, Joseph Mukasa Balikuddembe and Charles Lwanga. They had repeatedly defied the king by rescuing royal pages in their care from sexual exploitation by Mwanga.

These murders and Mwanga's continued resistance alarmed the British, who backed a rebellion by Christian and Muslim groups who supported Mwanga's half brother and defeated Mwanga at Mengo in 1888.  Mwanga's brother, Kiweewa Nnyonyintono, was elevated to the throne. He lasted exactly one month and was replaced on the throne by another brother, Kabaka Kalema Muguluma. However, Mwanga escaped and negotiated with the British. In exchange for handing over some of his sovereignty to the British East Africa Company, the British changed their backing to Mwanga, who swiftly removed Kalema from the throne in 1889. He later converted to Christianity and was baptised as a Protestant.

Final years
On 26 December 1890, Mwanga signed a treaty with Lord Lugard, granting certain powers over revenue, trade and the administration of justice to the Imperial British East Africa Company. These powers were transferred to the crown on 1 April 1893.

On 27 August 1894, Mwanga accepted for Buganda to become a Protectorate. However, on 6 July 1897 he declared war on the British and launched an attack but was defeated on 20 July 1897, in Buddu (in today's Masaka District). He fled into German East Africa (modern-day Tanzania), where he was arrested and interned at Bukoba.

He was deposed in absentia on 9 August 1897.  Tenacious as he was, he escaped and returned to Buganda with a rebel army, but was again defeated on 15 January 1898. He was captured and in April 1899 was exiled to the Seychelles. While in exile, he was received into the Anglican Church and was baptized with the name of Danieri (Daniel). He spent the rest of his life in exile. He died in the Seychelles on 8 May 1903, aged 34 or 35. On 2 August 1910, his remains were repatriated and buried at Kasubi.

Married life
Mwanga is on record as having married 17 wives:
 Damali Bayita Nanjobe
 Naabakyaala Dolosi Mwaan'omu Bakazikubawa
 Esiteri Nabunnya
 Naabakyaala Eveliini Kulabako, Omubikka
 Naabakyaala Loyiroosa Nakibuuka, Kaddulubaale
 Naabakyaala Samali Namuwanga, Sabaddu
 Nabweteme
 Nakijoba Nabulya (Elizabeeti Oliva Kyebuzibwa born of Mwanje Bikaali)
 Bezza Batwegombya
 Naabakyaala Ntongo, Kabejja
 Naabakyaala Nabisubi, Omuwanga
 Namirembe
 Lakeeri Mbekeka
 Nalwooga, Omuyigiriza
 Elizaabeeti Buteba
 Nattimba Binti Juma
 Amalemba Tutsi

Issue
Mwanga II fathered several sons and daughters from his 16 wives including Daudi Chwa II of Buganda: 

 Prince (Omulangira) Kagolo, whose mother was Damali Bayita Nanjobe. He was killed by his uncle Kalema, in 1889.
 Prince (Omulangira) Mulindwa, whose mother was Nabweteme
 Prince (Omulangira) Nganda, whose mother was Lakeeri Mbekeka
 Prince (Omulangira) Abdallah Mawanda whose mother was Lakeeri Mbekeka. Perceived as a potential agitator during the reign of Chwa, he was appointed as one of the British Agents to Kigezi in South Western Uganda.
 Daudi Chwa II of Buganda, who reigned from 1897 until 1939. His mother was Eveliini Kulabako.
 Prince (Omulangira) Yusuufu Suuna Kiweewa, whose mother was Esiteri Nabunnya. He was born at Mengo, Uganda on 16 February 1898 and was educated at Mengo High School and King's College Budo. Commissioned 2nd Lieutenant in October 1914. He served in the Great War from 1915 until 1919. Promoted to Lieutenant in the 7th Territorial Battalion on 25 May 1939. He served in the Second World War in Eastern Africa and in North Africa, from 1939 until 1940. Retired on 18 March 1940. He was implicated in the Buganda riots of 1949 and exiled to the Ssese Islands, where he died in 1949.
 Prince (Omulangira) Tobi, whose mother was Nabisubi
 Prince (Omulangira) Nayime?, whose mother was Loyiroosa Nakibuuka
 Princess (Omumbejja) Najjuma Katebe, whose mother is not mentioned
 Princess (Omumbejja) Anna Nambi Nassolo, whose mother was Samali Namuwanga
 Princess (Omumbejja) Mboni Maliamu Kajja-Obunaku, whose mother was Nattimba. She was educated at Saint Monica's School in Zanzibar.

Quotes

"I do not want to give them my land. I want all Europeans of all nations to come to Buganda, to build and to trade as they like."
 Mwanga's message to Euan Smith, British Consul in Zanzibar, 1890

"I am Mutesa's son, and what Mutesa was in Buganda that I will also be, and against those who will not have it so I shall make war."
 Mwanga to Karl Peters, 1890

"The English have come; they have built a fort; they eat my land; they have made me sign a treaty; they curtail my powers; and I get nothing from them in return."
 Mwanga after signing treaty with Captain Frederick Lugard, 1890

"Abalangira timba buli afuluma amira munne." [Princes are like pythons they swallow each other.]
 Mwanga after defeating the Muslim faction, 1893

"When I die it will be the end of the kingdom of Buganda. Europeans will take over (eat) this country of mine."
 Mwanga before joining forces with Kabalega, 1898

Quotes about Mwanga II 
"To his (Mwanga's) distorted view the missionaries were men banded together for the undermining of his authority, for sapping the affections and loyalty of his subjects and for ultimately occupying the whole of Buganda."
 Henry Morton Stanley, In Darkest Africa, 1890

"... there was, however, much good feeling and even tenderness in his character when he could be kept from bad habits and was free from evil influences."
 John Roscoe, Twenty Five Years in East Africa, 1921

"Mwanga was a jovial, friendly person who had many friends."
 Batolomewo Zimbe, Buganda ne Kabaka, 1939, p.53.

"Mwanga fought to free himself and his country of the intruders for all his reign. He did not like or want them; he was impressed by their power, but not interested in their ideas. He could not recover the old way of life nor adapt himself to the new, and in his perplexed and unhappy groping in the gap between he seems to me to deserve some sympathy."
 Kabaka Mutesa II, Desecration of My Kingdom, 1967

"He had wanted to be master in his own house, but unfortunately for him and for the monarchy, chieftainship triumphed over royal authority in a manner that had never happened before."
 MSM Kiwanuka, "Kabaka Mwanga and His Political Parties", 1969

"When Mwanga was brought to the capital as a captive the administration expected the people to be happy now that the enemy of their peace and religion was going into exile. On the contrary, people wanted him pardoned."
 Fr. John-Mary Waliggo, The Catholic Church in Buddu, 1976

"Mwanga ... was demonstrably unequal to the task of controlling the foreigners who were subverting his kingdom under his very nose. He did not have the experience or the prestige that had enabled his father to keep foreigners in their place within his kingdom."
 Samwiri R. Karugire, A Political History of Uganda, 1980

"Mwanga was quite right to seek to be the master in his own kingdom just as his forefathers had been, all his excesses and fault of character notwithstanding. Some of his predecessors had been guilty of worse acts of cruelty and injustice and nothing drastic had befallen them. In other words even if all the charges levelled against Mwanga by his numerous Christian and Muslim detractors were true, he was still right to claim supreme authority in the kingdom of his forefathers."
 Samwiri R. Karugire, A Political History of Uganda, 1980

"... Mwanga struck them (Ganda elders) as being kinder and gentler than Mutesa had been while a youth. For sheer tyranny, Mwanga II was easily outclassed by his father, grandfather and great grandfather, each of whom was remembered in Ganda tradition at the time of the British colonial take-over as having become uncontrollable at some stage during their respective reigns. This is something Mwanga never became."
 Morris Twaddle, Kakungulu, 1993 

"No Kabaka of Buganda had ever faced the challenges that Mwanga faced, dealing with mighty religious parties which eventually drove him from the throne and his kingdom."
 Samwiri Lwanga Lunyigo, Mwanga II, 2011, page 4

"Mwanga II should be judged within the context of nineteenth century Buganda, where kings had absolute executive, legislative, judicial, military and even economic power. To see him through the lenses of his foes, those who took away the sovereignty of his country and their local collaborators is to miss him. He cannot be understood through the fairy tales of his enemies who denounced him."
 Samwiri Lwanga Lunyigo, Mwanga II, 2011, p.35

Social Media Trend 
In early 2023, a social media trend emerged in Uganda and worldwide, featuring the name 'Kabaka-Mwanga.' The trend originated from a video shared on Ugandan social media platforms, in which a young boy from the suburbs of Uganda used the phrase as an exclamatory statement. This trend sparked renewed interest in the historical figure of Mwanga, a former Kabaka (ruler) of the Buganda Kingdom. The phenomenon captured the attention of both older Ugandans familiar with Mwanga's legacy and younger generations who were previously unaware of him.

See also
 Kabaka of Buganda
 Uganda Martyrs
 Muteesa Iof Buganda 
 Kimera of Buganda

References

Further reading 
Ashe, R. P. (1889). Two Kings of Uganda: Or, Life by the Shores of Victoria Nyanza. S. Low, Marston, Searle, & Rivington.
Kaggwa, Sir Apollo K, Basekabaka be’Buganda [translated by MM Semakula Kiwanuka]. Nairobi: East African Publishing House, 1971.
Kiwanuka, M. S. M. (1969). "Kabaka Mwanga and his political parties." Uganda Journal, 33(1), 1-16.
Lwanga-Lunyigo, Samwiri (2011). Mwanga II : Resistance to Imposition of British colonial rule in Buganda, 1884-1899. Wavah Books.

External links
 List of Kings of Buganda
 The vilification of Kabaka Mwanga

1868 births
1903 deaths
19th-century Ugandan LGBT people
19th-century monarchs in Africa
Anti-Christian sentiment
Converts to Protestantism from pagan religions
Kabakas of Buganda
LGBT royalty
Persecution of Christians
Ugandan chiefs
Ugandan Protestants
20th-century Ugandan LGBT people